Sir Henry Holcroft (1586–1650) was an English politician who sat in the House of Commons between 1624 and 1629 and held appointments in the Dublin Castle administration in Ireland.

Holcroft was the son of Thomas Holcroft of Battersea, Surrey, and Joan Roydon, and grandson of Geoffrey Holcroft of Hurst, Lancashire. In 1592 his mother married Sir Oliver St John.

On 30 August 1616 he was appointed Chief Secretary for Ireland under Sir Oliver St John in his capacity as Lord Deputy of Ireland. On 13 March 1617 he was made Chancellor of the Exchequer of Ireland. He acquired property in County Limerick and County Kerry by engaging in the common official practice of speculating in the discovery of concealed lands. He was knighted at Whitehall on 1 May 1622 and took office twelve days later as the king's secretary for Irish business. The influence of Holcroft's ally, George Villiers, 1st Duke of Buckingham, ensured that he retained the role after the accession of Charles I of England in 1625. In 1624, he was elected Member of Parliament for Stockbridge. He was elected MP for Newton in 1628 and sat until 1629 when King Charles decided to rule without parliament for eleven years. He played an active role in the preparation of the royal concessions that were negotiated in the early months of 1628 with representatives of the settler communities in Ireland, in return for a substantial contribution to the costs of defending Ireland.

After the assassination of Buckingham, Holcroft served as a member of a new committee for dealing with Irish petitions and grievances. He engaged in various trading ventures, including an investment of £500 in the East India Company's 1629 voyage.

In 1634, he retired from duties in London and Dublin and became a justice of the peace in Essex, where he owned land at Greenstreet House, East Ham. During the English Civil War he was a supporter of Parliament and was a member of John Pym's council of war in 1643. In 1649–50 he became a parliamentary trustee for the disposal of the crown lands. Holcroft died in London at the age of about 64.

References

1586 births
1650 deaths
English justices of the peace
English MPs 1624–1625
English MPs 1628–1629
Chancellors of the Exchequer of Ireland
Chief Secretaries for Ireland
Roundheads